Israel competed at the 2010 Summer Youth Olympics in Singapore.

Medalists

Athletics

Boys
Field Events

Basketball

Boys

Gymnastics

Rhythmic gymnastics

Judo

Girls

Boys

Mixed event

Sailing

OCS – On the Course Side of the starting line

Swimming

Girls

Boys

Taekwondo

Boys

Triathlon

Girls

Mixed

References

External links
Competitors List: Israel

Youth Olympic Summer
Nations at the 2010 Summer Youth Olympics
Israel at the Youth Olympics